Fanatisme is a 1934 French historical drama film directed by Tony Lekain and Gaston Ravel and starring Pola Negri, Jean Yonnel and Lucien Rozenberg.

The film's sets were designed by the art director Claude Bouxin.

Cast
 Pola Negri as Rosine Savelli 
 Jean Yonnel as Le prince de Valnéro 
 Lucien Rozenberg as Napoleon III
 Andrée Lafayette as L'impératrice Eugénie
 Georges Flateau as Ardiotti 
 Pierre Richard-Willm as Marcel Besnard 
 Louisa de Mornand as La marquise de Contadès 
 Lilian Greuze as La comtesse Walewska 
 William Aguet as Le chambellan 
 Pierre Juvenet as Le duc de Morny 
 Gil Clary as La princesse Mathilde 
 Christian Argentin as Piétri

References

Bibliography 
 Mariusz Kotowski. Pola Negri: Hollywood's First Femme Fatale. University Press of Kentucky, 2014.

External links 
 

1934 films
1930s French-language films
Films directed by Gaston Ravel
Pathé films
Films set in the 19th century
French historical drama films
1930s historical drama films
Cultural depictions of Napoleon III
French black-and-white films
1934 drama films
1930s French films